Queen of the Slayers is an original novel based on the American television series Buffy the Vampire Slayer.

Plot summary
Following the Hellmouth's closure, hundreds of potential slayers have been awakened. Buffy Summers hoped that overturning the Slayer's self-sacrifice would result in her earning some relaxation following seven years of fighting. However, the victory is short-lived. Dark forces are arising to fill the gap left by the First.

Willow's magical spell which sent slayer essence across the world has resulted in girls everywhere discovering a new power. The Scoobies travel to Europe. In London, Giles races to reorganize the remnants of the Watchers Council, hoping to overcome the shortcomings of its previous incarnation. Buffy, Xander, Willow, Dawn, and Dawn's new best friend, a young slayer named Belle travel to Rome to train new Slayers that are drawn to the infamous Immortal, Buffy is attracted to the Immortal, an ambiguous yet charismatic character, who she does not fully trust during the whole novel. They soon hear of an unknown "Queen of the Slayers" who is getting a number of the fresh slayers to form a mystical army.  This likely evil seems determined to claim the slayer essence for herself, and viciously and cruelly murders any Slayers that don't cooperate with her and betray Buffy.

Faith and Robin Wood take a group of Slayers to the Hellmouth in Cleveland, which has gone supernova with evil, to stabilize the hell there. They face many casualties, and experience strange projections of The Legion of Three, three deadly Hellgods.

There are three factions of evils, two of them just want to defeat Buffy after she closed the Hellmouth, who want to kill Buffy, The so-called Queen of the Slayers who wants to destroy Buffy, along with her lover, Antonia Borgia (a sorcerer under the employ of The Immortal) and convinces newbie slayers that Buffy is just using them to gain power, and Two Vampire Sorcerers who live in the Borgia Hell Dimension, and The Legion of Three.

Xander goes to Africa hoping to find more about the origins of the slayer essence. He discovers instead that the good in the world is not enough to fight the bad, and that the deciding confrontation is drawing far too near. It will be slayer against slayer, as an ultimate battle of champions approaches.

Dawn goes into a coma, because she was The Key, and has a link to the Earth, which is crumbling because of the supernova Hellmouth in Cleveland, and the Hellgods who are breaking through the barrier. Willow also seems to go into a coma, but is somehow woken up by a kiss from her lover, Kennedy when she, Faith and Robin are called back to Rome, because of the non-ending battle in deserted Cleveland.

Buffy, Willow, Kennedy, Belle, Vi, and Rona head to Brazil (under the orders of an angelic, Tara), to get The Death Orchid which has healing abilities, and they are attacked by The Queen of the Slayers. They are saved from poison darts by one of the rogue slayers, Haley, who realizes what she has done and gives them the antidote. They then go to Tibet, to meet with the infamous sorcerer, The Golden One, and re-meet Oz who is one of the werewolves that protect The Golden One. After the Golden One is killed, Oz and his wolf-pack decide to head to Rome, to help Buffy and her Slayers against the upcoming battle.

After healing Dawn, Buffy goes on patrol along with Faith who meet a rogue Slayer who they believe is leading them into a trap, and their belief comes reality when she leads the Slayer sisters right into the hands of Ornella, the Queen of the Slayers and her demons. Buffy and Faith waste the demons easily and escape back to The Immortal's castle, where he betrays them, for power, knocks them out, and ties them up.

Buffy, unconscious is visited by the good demon, Whistler. The Powers that Be have sent him to The Slayer for her to see the battle going on in L.A. that has Angel, a resurrected Spike, and their team fighting against the hell that Wolfram & Hart has sent upon them. Buffy cries tears of horror as she believes that both the vampires who loved her will die again. She is then joined by both Angel and Spike's souls, and together they create an angelic daughter with all of their features, who gives Buffy the strength she needs to wake up, gather her friends, her team, her Slayers, and defeat The Legion of Three.

Buffy wakes up the morning after the battle, to find her friends building her funeral pyre believing her to be dead again. She finds her friends safe and sound, though Faith was forced to kill Slayers who wouldn't surrender. Buffy has a confidential conversation with Willow who reveals that she also saw Buffy's future daughter, Buffy looks into the sunset, declares her love for all of her friends (including Andrew), healing after the battle, and vows to see Angel, and Spike again.

Continuity

Intended to be set after BtVS's seventh season, it takes place over the period of around a year immediately following "Chosen".
In the novel the characters discover that the First Slayer was named Senaya. This name is partially canon, as Willow refers to her by "Sineya" during her spell in "Restless".

Canonical Issues

Buffy/Angel novels such as this one are not usually considered canon by the fans. Some consider them stories from the imaginations of authors and artists, while others think of them as taking place in an alternate reality. However, these novels are not mere fan fiction, as overviews which summarize their plots are approved early on by both FOX and Joss Whedon (or at least his office). The books are then published as official Buffy/Angel merchandise.

In the case of this particular book, Joss Whedon's canonical Buffy the Vampire Slayer season eight comics series appears to directly contradict the events laid out in this novel. Therefore, the series' events which Queen of the Slayers features, such as Buffy's relationship with The Immortal, are now considered to be non-canon.

In the season eight comics, the Buffy that has a relationship with the Immortal is one of three plants.  Three "Buffy's" are in various places, so no one knows who is the real one and who isn't because they are being hunted by the United States government.

See also

Buffy novels: These tend to surround the character of Buffy and the fictional town of Sunnydale.
Angel novels: These instead focus on Angel and his so-called 'Fang Gang' in LA.
"Tales of the Slayer": These chronicle the stories of past slayers.
Buffyverse

External links

Reviews
Teen-books.com - Reviews of this book
Shadowcat.name - Review of this book

2005 American novels
2005 fantasy novels
Books based on Buffy the Vampire Slayer